Khosrowabad in Selseleh County may refer to:

Khosrowabad (33°47′ N 48°16′ E), Selseleh